The Cougar C28 was a Group C sports car prototype build by Courage. It was used in the World Sports-Prototype Championship sports car racing series in 1992. Power came from a 3.0-liter Porsche 6-cylinder turbocharged engine. It managed to achieve an impressive 3 podium finishes and 1 class win. Highlights include an overall 6th-place finish at that year's prestigious 24 Hours of Le Mans, two third-place finishes and a sixth-place finish for Tomas Saldaña at the Interserie races in Jarama, Zeltweg, and Brands Hatch (respectively), and a third-place finish for Marco Brand at the Interserie race in Mugello.

References

Le Mans Prototypes
24 Hours of Le Mans race cars
Rear-wheel-drive vehicles
Mid-engined cars
Sports prototypes
Cars introduced in 1992
C28
Cars powered by boxer engines
Group C